Ellora Derenoncourt is an American economist. She is an assistant professor of Economics in the Industrial Relations Section of the Department of Economics at Princeton University, and previously at the Department of Economics and assistant professor of Public Policy at the Goldman School of Public Policy at UC Berkeley. Her work focuses on labor economics, economic history and the study of inequality. Her research on racial inequality in the United States has been featured on NPR, New York Times, and The Wall Street Journal.

Education
Derenoncourt graduated from Harvard University with a Bachelor of Arts in Gender studies and a minor in molecular biology. In 2011 she received her Masters in Science in Human Geography Research from the London School of Economics and got her Ph.D. in Economics from Harvard University. She was also a visiting student at the UC Berkeley Center for Equitable Growth from 2016 to 2017.

Research
Her work on racial inequality has focused on the gaps in earnings by race and on the evolution of racial inequality in the 20th century. She has examined the backlash in the northern U.S. states toward the Great Migration and the resulting problems in black upward mobility. Her paper with Claire Montialoux demonstrates the role minimum wage played in racial income disparities between black and white workers in the United States in the late 1960s and early 1970s, where the expansion of the minimum wage in 1967 accounted for a 20% of the decrease in racial income gaps.

Currently, Derenoncourt is working on her research on the economic history of institutions and the economics of inequality.

Awards
She was awarded the Economic History Association's Allan Nevins Prize for best dissertation in 2019 for her work in American Economic history. She is one of the CIFAR Azrieli Global Scholars for the 2021-2023 cohort.

Selected works

 Derenoncourt, E., Bahn, K., & Montialoux, C. (2020). Why minimum wages are a critical tool for achieving racial justice in the U.S. labor market. WCEG Issue Brief.
 Derenoncourt, E., & Montialoux, C. (2020). Opinion | To Reduce Racial Inequality, Raise the Minimum Wage. Nytimes.com. Retrieved June 3, 2021.

References

Harvard College alumni
Alumni of the London School of Economics
Goldman School of Public Policy faculty
American women economists
21st-century American economists
Year of birth missing (living people)
Living people
21st-century American women
African-American economists
African-American women